Lower Green Swamp Preserve, formerly the Cone Ranch, is a  nature preserve northeastern Hillsborough County, Florida near Plant City. Hikers and equestrians enjoy almost  of sunny, open hiking and equestrian trails winding through the southern portion of the preserve.

Facilities 
This land is kept in a primitive state for the benefit of the native plants and wildlife. There is no running water but a portable toilet is located across the trail from the office, near the southernmost bridge. Bicyclists are not permitted and there is no camping or hunting allowed on the preserve.

History 
The preserve includes former cattle ranchland and farmlands that are now being restored to a more natural state.  Canals built for flood relief were blocked, and efforts continue to restore the natural hydrology of the preserve.  The property was purchased by the West Coast Regional Water Supply Authority in 1988 for groundwater pumping, a plan that was later blocked by changes in federal rules. A proposed sports complex plan in the 2000s met with public criticism and proposals to turn the land into private hunting camps were also defeated. The property was eventually sold to Florida's Jan K. Platt Environmental Lands Acquisition and Protection Program in 2010. In January 2014, a portion of the land was opened for public use, and the preserve became a popular destination for hiking, horseback riding, and wildlife viewing.
More land is being removed from the cattle lease, which will allow the continuation of the size of the restored area.

Flora and fauna 
Species in the area include white-tailed deer, Sherman's fox squirrels, bald eagles, Southern fox squirrels, wood storks, and barred owls.   Staff maintain trails and the parking area, performing prescribed fire to benefit native plants and wildlife, monitoring wildlife, and removing invasive plants such as natal grass and chinese tallow tree.

References

Protected areas of Hillsborough County, Florida
Nature reserves in Florida